Joseph Swain may refer to:

 Joseph Swain (academic) (1857–1927), American president of Indiana University
 Joseph Swain (engraver) (1820–1909), English wood-engraver associated with Punch magazine
 Joseph Swain (footballer) (fl. 1903), English footballer
 Joseph Swain (poet) (1761–1796), British Baptist minister and hymnwriter

See also
 Joseph Swan (disambiguation)